Chet Baker Sings is the debut vocal album by jazz musician Chet Baker, released in 1954 by Pacific Jazz Records. In 2001, the album received the Grammy Hall of Fame Award. Baker would return to selections from this album throughout his career. "My Funny Valentine" was regularly included in his concert performances, and is considered by some to be his signature song.

Track listing

Original LP (Pacific PJLP-11)
Side one:
"But Not for Me" - 3:04
"Time After Time" - 2:46
"My Funny Valentine" - 2:21
"I Fall in Love Too Easily" - 3:21

Side two:
"There Will Never Be Another You" - 3:00
"I Get Along Without You Very Well (Except Sometimes)" - 2:59
"The Thrill is Gone" - 2:51
"Look for the Silver Lining" - 2:39

1956 LP reissue (Pacific PJ-1222)
This issue features additional tracks 1-6, which were recorded on July 23 and 30, 1956.

Personnel
Chet Baker - vocals, trumpet
Russ Freeman - piano, celesta
Carson Smith - double bass
Joe Mondragon - double bass
Bob Neel - drums
Jimmy Bond - double bass
Larance Marable - drums
Peter Littman - drums

Production
Richard Bock – producer
Gerald Heard – liner notes
William Claxton – photography

References

 

Chet Baker albums
1954 albums
Grammy Hall of Fame Award recipients
Pacific Jazz Records albums